Vasas SC is a Hungarian handball club, based in XIII. district of Budapest, Hungary.

European record
As of 15 August 2018:

EHF-organised seasonal competitions
Vasas score listed first. As of 26 November 2018.

European Cup and Champions League

IHF and EHF Cup

City Cup (Challenge Cup)

Cup Winners' Cup
From the 2016–17 season, the women's competition was merged with the EHF Cup.

References

External links
 Official website
 Vasas SC at eurohandball.com

Hungarian handball clubs in European handball